Liever Marches Bay is a shallow bight on the north shore of the island of St. John, U.S. Virgin Islands, just east of Brown Bay, towards the eastern end of the island.  It has a  shingle beach.

Historic district

Liever Marches Bay Historic District, east of Brown Bay on the island of Saint John, Virgin Islands, is a historic district which was listed on the National Register of Historic Places in 1981.  The listing included three contributing sites. It is located in the central area of Virgin Islands National Park.

It includes all of a smallish triangular flat area behind the beach. It includes ruins of an abattoir which probably served cattle-farming in the Brown Bay plantation and other plantation areas which had completely converted away from sugar cane or other more intensive agriculture. It also includes ruins two water wells with drinking troughs.

References

National Register of Historic Places in Virgin Islands National Park
Landforms of Saint John, U.S. Virgin Islands
Bays of the United States Virgin Islands
Historic districts on the National Register of Historic Places in the United States Virgin Islands